Adisomus is a monotypic genus of hubbardiid short-tailed whipscorpions, first described by Cokendolpher & Reddell in 2000. Its single species, Adisomus duckei is distributed in Brazil.

References 

Schizomida genera
Monotypic arachnid genera